Goose Lake Aerodrome  is a privately owned aerodrome with an all weather gravel runway and a seasonal ice runway located on Goose Lake, Nunavut, Canada. The ice runway is, subject to operator maintenance, open from January to April, and, along with the land based gravel runway, service the related explorations for gold as part of the Back River Gold Project.

References

Registered aerodromes in the Kitikmeot Region